This is a list of electoral division results for the Australian 2010 federal election in the state of Tasmania.

Overall

Results by division

Bass

Braddon

Denison

Franklin

Lyons

See also 

 2010 Australian federal election
 Results of the 2010 Australian federal election (House of Representatives)
 Post-election pendulum for the 2010 Australian federal election
 Members of the Australian House of Representatives, 2010–2013

Notes

References 

Tasmania 2010